Alan Rogers Travel Group was formed in 2012 following the purchase of various brands from the former Mark Hammerton Group Ltd by The Caravan and Motorhome Club.

Current products and services

Alan Rogers Guides 

The most established and best-known product offered by Alan Rogers Travel Group is the campsite guidebooks, started in 1968 by Alan Rogers. Since their inception, the guides have provided readers with an independent recommendation of the highest quality campsites in Europe. In 2011, themed guides were launched including a guide to glamping. Available in both English and Dutch, the guides covered nine titles including the best campsites for children, dogs, fishing, golf, beach, nature, walking and cycling, spa and active holidays plus two German titles and a Dutch naturist guide. The themed series was reduced to the four core titles in 2014, which were subsequently discontinued in 2016. 

All guides were temporarily discontinued in 2017 in preparation for a special 50th-anniversary edition that was published in February 2018. The publication of the guide also coincided with what would have been Alan’s 100th birthday. A European guide has been published every year since.

Destinations Magazine

Destinations magazine was launched in 2012 to provide readers with inspiration for their next holiday. Issues were released in February and October to coincide with major exhibitions. The first run was published in English, Dutch and Danish. This run was stopped in 2015. The magazine was relaunched in 2020.

Alan Rogers Rallies

Alan Rogers Rallies provide ferry inclusive holiday bookings for groups of like-minded travellers, often with a shared interest, such as ownership of a particular brand of caravan.

Worldwide Caravan and Motorhome Holidays 

Launched in 2018 Alan Rogers - Worldwide Caravan and Motorhome Holidays offer escorted or self-guided, flight-inclusive motorhome or caravan holidays in a range of destinations throughout the world including Australia, Canada, New Zealand, USA and Southern Africa.

Alan Rogers (Australia) Pty Ltd 

Alan Rogers Travel opened a subsidiary office in Australia in 2020 to sell their Worldwide Caravan and Motorhome Holidays products to the Australian and New Zealand markets.

Past products and services

Alan Rogers Travel Service

The Alan Rogers Travel Service was the tour operating arm of the Alan Rogers Travel Group. The service focused on pitch and ferry bookings for camping, caravanning and motorhome holidays across the UK and Europe. Travel operations were moved to the Caravan Club in October 2015 as part of the takeover.

Camping Cheque

Alan Rogers Travel Group was the UK agent for Camping Cheque, a French company that offers a fixed rate, low season scheme for campsite holidays. Along with the Alan Rogers Travel Service. The scheme closed in 2018 due to changes in the French organisation.

Belle France

Belle France was a hotel-based walking and cycling holiday operator, established in 1986, that offered a wide range of routes through the French countryside. Maps and notes were provided for the self-guided tours, which were graded according to their difficulty. The company was wound down in 2020, in part due to the effects of the COVID-19 impact of travel demand.

Alan Rogers Marketing

Alan Rogers Marketing was set up in the Netherlands in 2005 to assist campsites in promoting themselves at exhibitions and provide advertising opportunities, both within the guides themselves and in the Destinations magazine. The office in the Netherlands closed in 2016 with business to business marketing activities now taking place from the UK office.

Alan Rogers Travel Card

The Alan Rogers Travel Card was launched in 2012, a benefits scheme that offered cardholders perks at selected campsites. This scheme closed in 2015 following the takeover by the Caravan Club.

History 

In 2012 the Mark Hammerton Group was acquired by The Caravan and Motorhome Club and a new company, the Alan Rogers Travel Group Ltd was formed. The company continues to operate independent of the Club, offering products to non-members.

See also 
Alan Rogers
Alan Rogers Guides
The Caravan Club

References

External links 
 alanrogers.com - Official website for the guides
 worldwide.alanrogers.com - Official website for Worldwide Caravan and Motorhome Holidays
 rallies.alanrogers.com - Official website for Alan Rogers Rallies
 bellefrance.com - Official website for Belle France
 

Travel and holiday companies of the United Kingdom
Travel and holiday companies of Australia